Qoli Laleh, also rendered as Gol Laleh and Quli Laleh, may refer to:
 Qoli Laleh-ye Olya
 Qoli Laleh-ye Sofla